When Farmer Met Gryce is an album by trumpeter Art Farmer and saxophonist Gigi Gryce, featuring performances recorded in 1954 and 1955 and released on the Prestige label.

Reception
The AllMusic review stated: "all eight numbers will easily be enjoyed by straight-ahead jazz fans." The Penguin Guide to Jazz gave it a 3½-star review, expressing a slight preference for the co-leaders' later album, Art Farmer Quintet featuring Gigi Gryce.

Track listing
All compositions by Gigi Gryce, except as indicated
 "A Night at Tony's" – 5:06     
 "Blue Concept" – 4:56     
 "Stupendous-Lee" – 5:47     
 "Deltitnu" – 4:18     
 "Social Call" – 6:04     
 "Capri" – 5:01     
 "Blue Lights" – 5:19     
 "The Infant's Song" (Farmer) – 5:15  
Recorded at Van Gelder Studio in Hackensack, New Jersey on May 19, 1954 (tracks 1–4) and May 26, 1955 (tracks 5–8)

Personnel
Art Farmer – trumpet
Gigi Gryce – alto saxophone
Horace Silver (tracks 1–4), Freddie Redd (tracks 5–8) – piano
Percy Heath (tracks 1–4), Addison Farmer (tracks 5–8) – bass
Kenny Clarke (tracks 1–4), Art Taylor (tracks 5-8) – drums

References 

1955 albums
Art Farmer albums
Gigi Gryce albums
Albums produced by Bob Weinstock
Albums recorded at Van Gelder Studio
Prestige Records albums